Valentín Guzmán Soto (born 14 February 1966) is a Mexican politician affiliated with the PRD. As of 2013 he served as Senator of the LXI Legislature of the Mexican Congress representing Guerrero.

References

1966 births
Living people
Politicians from Guerrero
Members of the Senate of the Republic (Mexico)
Party of the Democratic Revolution politicians
21st-century Mexican politicians